The 2014 United Supercup, officially named G-Drive 2014 United Supercup (also known as 2014 United Tournament), was an exhibition football club tournament held in Israel from 30 January – 5 February 2014. It is the second edition of the United Tournament.  The location was picked because the winter conditions would make it hard to play the games in Russia or Ukraine.

Summary
The four participating clubs were Shakhtar Donetsk, Metalist Kharkiv from Ukraine and Zenit St. Petersburg, CSKA Moscow from Russia. The clubs were picked by the principle of two top placed clubs in the local championships.

Before the tournament a press conference was held in Tel Aviv. Among the participants were Valery Gazzaev, the head of the committee in charge of the united championship, Mircea Lucescu, the manager of Shakhtar Donetsk, Leonid Slutskiy, the manager of PFC CSKA Moscow, Myron Markevych, the manager of Metallist Kharkiv, and Luciano Spalletti, the manager of FC Zenit Saint Petersburg. The tournament was also attended by Mikhail Fomenko, the manager of Ukraine national football team.

Shakhtar Donetsk and CSKA Moscow were based in Tel Aviv for the tournament, while Metallist Kharkiv in Netanya, and Zenit Saint Petersburg in Herzeliya.

The games were broadcast by Football 1 and Football 2 channels in Ukraine and by Russia 2, Sport 1 and 100TV channels in Russia.

The tournament format was round-robin (instead of two-legged ties for all pairs of clubs from different countries, as played previously). In case of a draw at the end of the 90 minutes, penalties were used to decide the winner (however, a club winning on penalties gets 2 points and not 3, while a club losing on penalties gets 1 point for draw).

The first two games of the tournament were watched by 3 million Russians, which is 1 million more than the previous edition average.

The 2014 tournament was won by Shakhtar Donetsk from Ukraine, winning all 3 games. Douglas Costa and Darijo Srna from Shakhtar Donetsk became the joint top scorers of the tournament scoring two goals each, Darijo Srna was also named the tournament best player.

Teams

Venues

Standings

Matches

Top scorers

Winners

See also
Channel One Cup

References

External links
 2014 tournament at Sovsport.ru
 2014 tournament at Sports.ru
 2014 tournament at Korrespondent.net
 2014 tournament at UA-Football
 2014 tournament at Sport-Express
 2014 tournament at Championat

2014
2014
2013–14 in Ukrainian football
2013–14 in Russian football
2013–14 in Israeli football